Ganghwa Anglican Cathedral is a cathedral of the Anglican Church's Diocese of Seoul, opened on November 15, 1900, also known as Ganhwa-eup Cathedral by its location, Ganghwa-eup, Ganghwa county. It is the first Hanok-style cathedral in Korea as well as the first one in Ganghwado island.

History 
Charles John Corfe, the first bishop of the Anglican Church of Korea, established the cathedral in November 15, 1900, in commemoration of Koreans who had been baptized in 1896 in Ganghwado island for the first time. It is the oldest Anglican church in Korea, where Kim Heejun, the first Korean Anglican priest, whose ordination was approved in 1915, was ordained. His ordination approval document written in Korean is preserved in the chapel.

Features 
The interior of the church belongs to the basilica style while the hanok exterior is similar to typical Buddhist temples in Korea, which reflects localization of Anglican Church.

Anglican cathedrals in South Korea
Churches in Seoul
Churches completed in 1900